Georg Pfotzer (29 November 1909 – 24 July 1981) was a German physicist.

He was a student of Erich Regener in the 1930s and worked with Regener to investigate cosmic rays by using balloons to carry scientific instruments such as Geiger counters to the upper atmosphere. The terms Pfotzer curve and Pfotzer maximum, relating to the distribution of charged particles in the atmosphere resulting from cosmic rays, are named after him. It has been suggested that this is misleading, as Regener was the principal investigator, but he was persecuted and forced to resign during the Nazi era as his wife was of Jewish ancestry.

He was director of the Max Planck Institute for Solar System Research between 1965 and 1977.

External links
 Helmut Rosenbauer: Nachruf für Professor Dr.-Ing. Georg Pfotzer (29. 11. 1909 - 24. 7. 1981) in Physikalische Blätter

Publications
 Regener, E. and Pfotzer, G.: Messungen der Ultrastrahlung in der oberen Atmosphäre mit dem Zählrohr (in German), Phys. Zeit. 35, 779–784, 1934.
 Regener E. and Pfotzer, G.: Intensity of the Cosmic Ultra-Radiation in the Stratosphere with the Tube-Counter, Nature, 134, 325–325, 1935

References

20th-century German physicists
1909 births
1981 deaths
Cosmic ray physicists
Max Planck Institute directors